The 2004 Campeonato Ecuatoriano de Fútbol de la Serie A (known as the 2004 Copa Pílsener Serie A for sponsorship reasons) was the 47th season of the Serie A, the top level of professional football in Ecuador. Deportivo Cuenca won their first national championship.

Format
The format for 2004 remained the same for this season.

The First Stage and Second Stage are identical. The ten teams competed in a double round-robin tournament, one game at home and one away. The top three teams in each stage qualified to the Liguilla Final with bonus points (2, 1, and .5 points, respectively). The First Stage winner and runner-up qualified to the 2004 Copa Sudamericana. At the end of the Second Stage, the two teams with the fewest points were relegated to the Serie B.

The Liguilla Final was a double round-robin tournament between the six qualified teams of the First and Second Stage. The winner of the Liguilla Final was crowned the Serie A champion. The champion and runner-up also qualified to the 2005 Copa Libertadores into the Second Stage, while the third-place finisher qualified to the First Stage.

First stage

Second stage

Aggregate table

Liguilla Final

External links
2004 season on RSSSF

Ecuadorian Serie A seasons
Ecu
Football